Lenna (or Lena) is a standard test image used in the field of digital image processing starting in 1973, but it is no longer considered appropriate by some authors. It is a picture of the Swedish model Lena Forsén, shot by photographer Dwight Hooker, cropped from the centerfold of the November 1972 issue of Playboy magazine. The continued use of the image has attracted controversy, on both technical and social grounds, and many journals have discouraged or banned its use. Forsén herself has asked for the image to be retired.

The spelling "Lenna" came from the model's desire to encourage the proper pronunciation of her name.  "I didn't want to be called Leena []," she explained.

History 
Before Lenna, the first use of a Playboy magazine image to illustrate image processing algorithms was in 1961. Lawrence G. Roberts used two cropped six-bit grayscale facsimile scanned images from Playboy'''s July 1960 issue featuring Playmate Teddi Smith, in his MIT master's thesis on image dithering.

Intended for high resolution color image processing study, the Lenna picture's history was described in the May 2001 newsletter of the IEEE Professional Communication Society, in an article by Jamie Hutchinson:

The image's reach was limited in the 1970s and 80s, which is reflected in it initially only appearing in .org domains. But in July 1991, the image featured on the cover of Optical Engineering alongside Peppers, another popular test image. This drew the attention of Playboy to the potential copyright infringement. The peak of image hits on the internet was in 1995. The scan became one of the most used images in computer history. The use of the photo in electronic imaging has been described as "clearly one of the most important events in [its] history". The image spread to over 100 different domains, particularly .com and .edu.

In a 1999 issue of IEEE Transactions on Image Processing "Lena" was used in three separate articles, and the picture continued to appear in scientific journals throughout the beginning of the 21st century.

Lenna is so widely accepted in the image processing community that Forsén was a guest at the 50th annual Conference of the Society for Imaging Science and Technology (IS&T) in 1997. In 2015, Lena Forsén was also guest of honor at the banquet of IEEE ICIP 2015. After delivering a speech, she chaired the best paper award ceremony.

To explain why the image became a standard in the field, David C. Munson, editor-in-chief of IEEE Transactions on Image Processing, stated that it was a good test image because of its detail, flat regions, shading, and texture. He also noted that "the Lena image is a picture of an attractive woman. It is not surprising that the (mostly male) image processing research community gravitated toward an image that they found attractive."

While Playboy often cracks down on illegal uses of its material and did initially send a notice to the publisher of Optical Engineering about its unauthorized use in that publication, over time it has decided to overlook the wide use of Lena. Eileen Kent, VP of new media at Playboy, said, "We decided we should exploit this, because it is a phenomenon."

 Criticism 
The use of the image has produced controversy because Playboy is "seen (by some) as being degrading to women". In a 1999 essay on reasons for the male predominance in computer science, applied mathematician Dianne P. O'Leary wrote:

A 2012 paper on compressed sensing used a photo of the model Fabio Lanzoni as a test image to draw attention to this issue.

The use of the test image at the magnet school Thomas Jefferson High School for Science and Technology in Fairfax County, Virginia provoked a guest editorial by a senior in The Washington Post in 2015 about its detrimental impact on aspiring female students in computer science.

In 2017, the Journal of Modern Optics published an editorial titled "On alternatives to Lenna" suggesting three images (Pirate, Cameraman, and Peppers) that "are reasonably close to Lenna in feature space".

In 2018, the Nature Nanotechnology journal announced that they would no longer consider articles using the Lenna image. In the same year SPIE, the publishers of Optical Engineering, also announced that they "strongly discourage" the use of the Lenna image, and would no longer consider new submissions containing the image "without convincing scientific justification for its use". They noted that aside from the copyright and ethical issues, that it was also no longer useful as a standard image:  "In today’s age of high-resolution digital image technology, it seems difficult to argue that a 512 × 512 image produced with a 1970s-era analog scanner is the best we have to offer as an image quality test standard".

Forsén stated in the 2019 documentary film Losing Lena, "I retired from modeling a long time ago. It’s time I retired from tech, too... Let's commit to losing me."

 Remastering 
 Jeff Seideman, of the Society for Imaging Science and Technology, was working with the archivist of Playboy to rescan the image from the original negatives.

 See also 
 Actroid
 Carole Hersee
 China Girl
 Lorem ipsum
 Shirley cards
 Stanford bunny
 Suzanne
 Utah teapot

 References 

 Sources 

 
 

 Further reading 
  image used numerous times in chapter 6

 External links 
 Lenna 97: A Complete Story of Lenna
 The Lenna Story the original story of Lenna and an un-cropped scan of the original Playboy'' photograph

1970s photographs
1972 in art
1972 works
Color photographs
Image processing
Playboy
Test items